Burrough-Dover House is located in Pennsauken, Camden County, New Jersey, United States. The house was built in 1710 and added to the National Register of Historic Places on October 25, 1973.  Restoration work on the house has been performed by the Pennsauken Historical Society.

See also
National Register of Historic Places listings in Camden County, New Jersey

References

Houses completed in 1710
Houses on the National Register of Historic Places in New Jersey
Houses in Camden County, New Jersey
National Register of Historic Places in Camden County, New Jersey
Pennsauken Township, New Jersey
New Jersey Register of Historic Places
1710 establishments in New Jersey